Tomer Tayar (born 15 January 1983) is a former Israeli footballer.

He is of a Tunisian-Jewish descent.

Honours
Liga Leumit (1):
2006-07
Toto Cup (Leumit) (1):
2006-07

External links
 Profile at One
 

1983 births
Living people
Israeli Jews
Israeli footballers
Footballers from Netanya
Maccabi Netanya F.C. players
Hapoel Ra'anana A.F.C. players
Bnei Sakhnin F.C. players
Hapoel Ironi Kiryat Shmona F.C. players
F.C. Ashdod players
Hapoel Acre F.C. players
Hapoel Ramat Gan F.C. players
Hapoel Nir Ramat HaSharon F.C. players
Israeli Premier League players
Liga Leumit players
Israeli people of Tunisian-Jewish descent
Association football midfielders